Paul Hartman (March 1, 1904 – October 2, 1973) was an American dancer, stage performer and television actor.

Early years
Born in San Francisco, California, Hartman was the son of Ferris Hartman, who was sometimes called the "Ziegfeld of the Pacific Coast" and actress Josie Hart. He began performing as a dancer with his sister when he was 4 years old. Hartman attended the University of California. After he left there, he worked for a newspaper in San Francisco, beginning as a copy boy and later becoming a reporter. He left the newspaper for the theater because the latter offered more money.

Career 
In 1922, he teamed up with Grace Barrett for a dancing comedy vaudeville act that consisted of them both paying homage to and gently mocking the popular dances of the day, from ballet to swing. They married in 1923. 

Along with Grace, Paul made his Broadway debut in Ballyhoo of 1932 alongside Bob Hope. They appeared in Cole Porter's Red Hot and Blue a few years later, and continued to perform on the Great White Way. Their act involved the crisp and witty Grace overwhelming the gangly, slack-jawed Paul, intermittently cut with dance numbers and musical comedy routines.

They went to Hollywood, where Paul appeared alongside Frank Sinatra and Victor Borge in 1943's Higher and Higher. Upon the Hartmans' return to Broadway, they resolved to take charge and write their own revue. They had a 1948 musical revue, Angel in the Wings, and the Hartmans were named best lead actor and actress in a musical that year at the second Tony Awards (the first to recognize musical performers).

They were then offered a sitcom on NBC, and The Hartmans (at Home) showed promise, but audiences rejected the show, which often featured canned scripts and little opportunity for the couple to show off their physical and musical abilities. Paul and Grace returned to Broadway, where they spent three years in a number of variety shows and revues. In 1951 he was elected a member of the famed theater club, The Lambs.

After divorcing in 1951, Grace was diagnosed with cancer in 1952. She died in 1955. Paul married actress Ann Buckles March 14, 1953; they later divorced in 1963.

Television and Hollywood had once again risen to the top of the entertainment world, and the convenience of television shooting and a quick paycheck lured Paul out to Los Angeles once more. Hartman began appearing in the 1953–1954 ABC situation comedy The Pride of the Family as Albie Morrison, the father and head of the household. Fay Wray, best known for King Kong, played his wife, Catherine, and Natalie Wood and Robert Hyatt played his children, Ann and Junior Morrison, respectively.

In 1957, Hartman returned one last time to Broadway, but then past fifty, he tired of the hectic stage life. He continued to play bit parts in movies and television throughout the rest of his life, most famously as handyman Emmett Clark on CBS's The Andy Griffith Show and Mayberry R.F.D. In a nod to his earlier life, he is seen doing a dance routine at Howard Sprague's party in the Andy Griffith episode "The Wedding", and in the Mayberry, RFD episode "All for Charity", he can be seen doing a soft shoe routine with costar Ken Berry. In addition, he had small parts on Petticoat Junction; Love, American Style; The Adventures of Ozzie and Harriet; Hazel; Ben Casey; The Twilight Zone; The Alfred Hitchcock Hour; Our Man Higgins; and Family Affair.

He was cast in the 1960 film Inherit the Wind. In 1967, he appeared with Robert Morse in the film version of How To Succeed In Business Without Really Trying.

Death 
Hartman died on October 2, 1973, from a heart attack in Los Angeles aged 69.

Filmography

References

External links

 
 

1904 births
1973 deaths
American male dancers
American male film actors
American male stage actors
American male television actors
Donaldson Award winners
Tony Award winners
Male actors from San Francisco
People from Greater Los Angeles
Vaudeville performers
20th-century American male actors
20th-century American dancers